Camberwell and Peckham is a constituency represented in the House of Commons of the UK Parliament since its 1997 creation by Harriet Harman of the Labour Party. Harman had served for the previous constituency of Peckham since 1982. She is a former cabinet minister and the "Mother of the House of Commons", having the longest record of continuous service of any female MP.

Constituency profile

The constituency is very ethnically diverse, and has the highest proportion of black, African, and Afro-Caribbean residents of all constituencies in England and Wales, according to Office of National Statistics 2011 Census figures, at 37.4%. This includes 22.4% being African (highest), 9.3% being Caribbean and 5.7% being of any other black background (highest). More than two-fifths (40.8%) of residents were born outside of the UK.

With 50.6% of all residential properties being social housing, it also has the highest proportion of social housing of any parliamentary constituency in the United Kingdom. More than three in 10 residents are single parents.

The area is also socially diverse with fine Georgian houses in parts of Camberwell, while Nunhead to the east has experienced considerable regeneration in recent years.

At least two conservation area groupings exist containing pockets of upmarket housing stock, principally Camberwell Grove and Camberwell Green. The housing stock has expanded in the early-21st century due to major increases in Central London property prices, which has led to new private sector-funded housing initiatives. As such, rents across the private rented sector have multiplied, affecting its long-term communities who have entrenched high reliance overall on the rented sector, pushing residents away by eviction or further away from owning their own homes near to their communities.

King's College Hospital, one of London's largest teaching hospitals, and the Maudsley Hospital are major employers in the constituency. One in seven residents are employed in human health and social work.

Boundaries

1997–2010: The London Borough of Southwark wards of Barset, Brunswick, Consort, Faraday, Friary, Liddle, St Giles, The Lane, and Waverley.

2010–present: The London Borough of Southwark wards of Brunswick Park, Camberwell Green, Faraday, Livesey, Nunhead, Peckham, Peckham Rye, South Camberwell, and The Lane.

The constituency incorporates the areas of Camberwell, Peckham and Nunhead in the London Borough of Southwark, together with parts of its other districts of Walworth, East Dulwich, South Bermondsey and Rotherhithe.

Political history
The constituency was created in 1997. All results since 1997 have been strong Labour Party majorities of 36.8% of the vote or greater. As the predecessor seats were Labour (in this instance the length of party tenure can be dated to 1936) and council wards tend to have strong majorities for the party, the seat has the three main hallmarks of a safe seat.

Its only MP to date is Harriet Harman, a former Cabinet minister and former Deputy Leader of the Labour Party, twice its acting leader during leadership elections in 2010 and 2015, and former Shadow Culture Secretary. She had been the MP for the preceding constituency of Peckham since a by-election in 1982.

Members of Parliament

Election results

Elections in the 2010s

Elections in the 2000s

Elections in the 1990s

See also
List of parliamentary constituencies in London
Southwark local elections

Notes

References

External links
nomis Constituency Profile for Camberwell and Peckham — presenting data from the ONS annual population survey and other official statistics.

UK General Elections since 1832 Richard Kimber's Political Science Resources
Politics Resources (election results from 1922 onwards)
Electoral Calculus (election results from 1955 onwards)

Politics of the London Borough of Southwark
Parliamentary constituencies in London
Constituencies of the Parliament of the United Kingdom established in 1997
Camberwell
Peckham
Harriet Harman